Bob Montgomery (born May 27, 1949) is an American small business owner and politician from Olathe, Kansas, formerly a Republican member of the Kansas House of Representatives representing the 15th House District, which covers southwest Olathe.

Legislative service and politics 
Montgomery has been a member of Olathe's City Council. His first term in the House began in January 2011 when he was elected by a caucus of Republican precinct leaders to replace fellow Republican Rob Olson in the 26th House District who was moving to the Kansas Senate. He was appointed to the standing committees on insurance; veterans, military and homeland security; financial institutions; elections; and transportation.

In 2012, Montgomery resigned from 26th district after the Federal Courts released new state house districts maps, in order to run for the new 15th district. He ran unopposed in the general election and defeated Elliot Lahn in the Republican primary.

Montgomery resigned from office effective December 31, 2013 citing family reasons.

References

External links 
Representative Bob Montgomery official Kansas Legislature website
Bob Montgomery for Representative
 
Montgomery and Company business website
Openstates
Midwest Democracy

Republican Party members of the Kansas House of Representatives
Politicians from Olathe, Kansas
Living people
1949 births
21st-century American politicians